Nicole Beharie  is an American actress. She is best known for her starring roles in films such as the drama American Violet (2008), the psychological drama Shame (2011), the biographical sports drama 42 (2013), and the independent drama Miss Juneteenth (2020). From 2013 to 2016, she starred in the Fox supernatural drama series Sleepy Hollow.

Early life
Beharie was born in West Palm Beach, Florida. When Beharie was little, her father was in the United States Foreign Service, so she grew up in the United Kingdom, Jamaica, Nigeria and Panama. She attended Orangeburg Wilkinson High School in Orangeburg, South Carolina, and is a 2003 graduate of the South Carolina Governor's School for the Arts & Humanities, a public residential high school in Greenville. Beharie was then accepted into Juilliard School, one of the most prestigious performing arts conservatories in the United States (Drama division Group 36: 2003–07). She was awarded a Shakespeare scholarship and trained in England.

Career
Beharie made her feature film debut in the 2008 film American Violet, where she played the leading role. Also in the same year she played Sarah Ward in the American sports film The Express: The Ernie Davis Story opposite actor Rob Brown. In the Lifetime movie, Sins of the Mother (2010), Beharie portrayed Shay Hunter, a struggling university student who goes on a journey to mend her fractured relationship with her mother Nona played by Jill Scott.

In 2011, Beharie performed five original songs as a singer-songwriter opposite German actor Ken Duken in the romantic drama My Last Day Without You. In the Russell Leigh Sharman film adaptation of his play Apartment 4E, she played Piper, a troubled young woman who never leaves her apartment. Beharie played Marianne in the Steve McQueen film Shame, portraying a love interest of Michael Fassbender. Wesley Morris of The Boston Globe praised her performance, calling her "a marvel of natural transparency".

In 2013, Beharie starred as Rachel Robinson, wife of Jackie Robinson (played by Chadwick Boseman), in the historical baseball feature 42. The same year, she began portraying Abbie Mills on the Fox fantasy series Sleepy Hollow, which is based on the 1820 short story "The Legend of Sleepy Hollow" by Washington Irving. In Spring 2016, Beharie departed the series, with her character dying in the series' third-season finale, the episode entitled "Ragnarok", which was aired April 8, 2016. She later stated that an autoimmune disease was one of the causes of her exit and also revealed that she struggled to find work and was labelled as problematic after her departure from the show.

In 2020, she starred in Miss Juneteenth, a film about a former pageant winner preparing her teenage daughter to assume her former crown.

Personal life
In 2015, Beharie posed for the May issue of Allure magazine.

Filmography

Film

Television

Theatre

Soundtrack appearances

Awards and nominations

References

External links
 
Nicole Beharie on Instagram

21st-century American actresses
Actresses from Florida
American film actresses
American stage actresses
Juilliard School alumni
American people of Jamaican descent
Living people
People from West Palm Beach, Florida
African-American actresses
Orangeburg-Wilkinson High School alumni
21st-century African-American women
21st-century African-American people
20th-century African-American people
20th-century African-American women
Year of birth missing (living people)